Norman Rogers (born August 25, 1966), known professionally as Terminator X, is an American DJ best known for his work with hip hop group Public Enemy, which he left in 1998. He also produced two solo albums, Terminator X & The Valley of the Jeep Beets  (1991) and Super Bad (1994), featuring Chuck D, Sister Souljah, DJ Kool Herc, the Cold Crush Brothers, and a bass music track by the Punk Barbarians.

In 2013, Terminator X was inducted into the Rock and Roll Hall of Fame as a member of Public Enemy.

Retirement
After retiring from the music scene, Rogers ran an ostrich farm in Vance County, North Carolina. In November 2018, Terminator X married Robin Dugger in Dayton, Ohio.

Discography

Studio albums
Terminator X & The Valley of the Jeep Beets (1991)
Super Bad (1994)

with Public Enemy
 Yo! Bum Rush the Show (1987)
 It Takes a Nation of Millions to Hold Us Back (1988)
 Fear of a Black Planet (1990)
 Apocalypse 91... The Enemy Strikes Black (1991)
 Muse Sick-n-Hour Mess Age (1994)
 Man Plans God Laughs (2015)

References

1966 births
American male rappers
Living people
American hip hop DJs
Hip hop record producers
People from Long Island
People from Vance County, North Carolina
Public Enemy (band) members
Rappers from New York (state)
21st-century American rappers